Andrew Joseph O'Donnell (5 July 1885 – 10 December 1965) was an Australian rules footballer who played for the Carlton Football Club in the Victorian Football League (VFL).

Notes

External links  
 
Andy O'Donnell's profile at Blueseum

1885 births
1965 deaths
Australian rules footballers from Victoria (Australia)
Carlton Football Club players